Herin Tanoro Milalao Fampianarana Mahajanga is a Malagasy football club based in Mahajanga, Madagascar.

In 1986 the team has won the Coupe de Madagascar.

Achievements
Coupe de Madagascar: 1
 1986

Performance in CAF competitions
 African Cup of Champions Clubs: 1 appearance
1984 African Cup of Champions Clubs: First Round

Stadium
Currently the team plays at the Rabemananjara Stadium.

References

External links

Football clubs in Madagascar